This is a list of viceroys (or lieutenants) of the Kingdom of Aragon.

Alonso de Aragón, bishop of Zaragoza 1517-1520
Juan de Lanuza y Torrellas 1520-1535
Beltrán de la Cueva, 3rd Duke of Alburquerque 1535-1539
Pedro Manrique de Luna y de Urrea, count of Morata de Jalón 1539-1554
Diego Hurtado de Mendoza y de la Cerda, prince of Melito 1554-1564
Ferran d'Aragón i de Gurrea, Bishop of Zaragoza 1566-1575
Artal de Aragón y Luna, count of Sástago 1575-1588
Iñigo de Mendoza y de la Cerda y Manrique de Luna, marquis of Almenara 1588
Miguel Martinez de Luna y Mendoza, count of Morata de Jalón 1592-1593
Diego Fernández de Cabrera Bobadilla y Mendoza, count of Chincón 1593-1601
Beltrán de la Cueva y Castilla, duke of Alburquerque 1601-1602
Ascanio Colonna, cardinal 1602-1604
Gastón de Moncada, 2nd Marquis of Aitona 1604-1610
Diego Carrillo de Mendoza, 1st Marquis of Gelves 1617-1620
Fernando de Borja y Aragón, count of Mayalde 1621-1632
Girolamo Carraffa e Carrascciolo, marquis de Montenegro 1632-1636
Pedro Fajardo de Requesens de Zuñiga y Pimentel, marquis of Los Velez 1635-1638
Francesco Maria Carafa, Duke of Nocera 1639-1640
Enrique de Pimentel y Moscoso, marquis of Tavara 1641
Gian Giacomo Teodoro Trivulzio, prince of Trivulzio, cardinal 1642-1645
Bernardino Fernández de Velasco, 6th Duke of Frías 1645-1647
Francisco de Melo, count of Assmar 1647-1649
Francisco Fernández de Castro Andrade de Portugal e Legnano de Gattinara, count of Lemos and count of Andrade 1649-1653
Fabrizzio Pignatelli, prince of Nòia, duke (married with the duchess) of Monteleone  1654-1657
Niccolò Ludovisi, prince of Piombino and Venosa 1659-1662
Ferran de Borja d'Aragón i Barreto, count of Mayalde 1662-1664
Francisco de Idiáquez de Butrón Mogica y de Álava, duke of Ciudad Real 1664-1667
Ettore Pignatelli d'Aragona e Cortés, duke (married with the duchess) of Terranova, prince of Noia, duke of Moteleone  1668
Pedro Pablo Ximénez de Urrea Fernández de Heredia y Zapata, count of Aranda 1668-1669
Juan Jose de Austria 1669-1676
Lorenzo Onofrio Colonna e Gioeni-Cardona, Prince of Paliano 1678-1681
Jaime Fernández de Hixar-Silva Sarmiento de la Cerda, duke of Hixar 1681-1687
Carlo Antonio Spinelli, prince of Cariati, duke of Seminara 1688-1691
Baltasar de los Cobos Luna Sarmiento de Mendoza Zúñiga y Manrique, marquis of Camarasa 1692-1693
Juan Manuel Fernández Pacheco Cabrera y Bobadilla, marquis of Villena and duke of Escalona 1693-1695
Domenico del Giudice e Palagno, duke of Giovenazzo, prince of Cellamare 1695
Baltasar de los Cobos Luna Sarmiento de Mendoza Zúñiga y Manrique, marquis of Camarasa 1696-1699 (second time)

External links
  Virreinato de Aragon

 
Crown of Aragon
Aragon